Shanghai Rumba is a 2006 Chinese romance drama film written and directed by Peng Xiaolian, starring the real-life couple Yuan Quan and Xia Yu (before their marriage in 2009). Set in 1940s Shanghai, the story is loosely based on the real love story of film actors Zhao Dan and Huang Zongying, although names have been changed.

Plot
Wanyu (Yuan Quan), a young woman unhappily constrained by the rules of the traditional Chinese society, accidentally meets film star A Chuan (Xia Yu) when she is offered a role in his film. Her life completely changes from that moment on.

References
Faster Cha Cha for Shanghai Rumba, Shanghai Daily, 2006-01-05

External links
Trailer w/ English subtitles on YouTube

Chinese drama films
Films directed by Peng Xiaolian